The 2006 America East men's basketball tournament was held from March 3–5 at the Binghamton University Events Center. The final was held March 11 at the Recreation and Convocation Center at the University at Albany. Albany gained its first ever berth in the NCAA tournament with its win over Vermont. Albany was given the 16th seed in the Washington D.C. Regional of the NCAA Tournament and lost in the first round to Connecticut 72–59, after Albany nearly became the first 16 seed to upset a 1 seed with a twelve-point lead with just over eleven minutes to play.

Bracket and Results

See also
America East Conference

References

America East Conference men's basketball tournament
2005–06 America East Conference men's basketball season